Old Meeting House, Old Meeting-house, or Old Meetinghouse may refer to:

 Old Allenstown Meeting House or Allenstown Meeting House, in Allenstown, New Hampshire
 Old Haverford Friends Meetinghouse, in Havertown, Pennsylvania
 Old Indian Meeting House, in Mashpee, Massachusetts
 Old Jewry Meeting-house, in London, England
 Old Kennett Meetinghouse, in Kennett Township, Chester County, Pennsylvania
 Old Meetinghouse of the Bethany or Old Bethany Church, in Bethany, West Virginia
 Old Mulkey Meetinghouse, in Tompkinsville, Kentucky
 Old North Meeting House or Rockingham Meeting House, in Rockingham, Vermont
 Old Presbyterian Meeting House, in Alexandria, Virginia
 Old Quaker Meeting House (Queens), in Queens, New York
 Old South Meeting House, in Boston, Massachusetts
 Old Town Friends' Meetinghouse, in Baltimore, Maryland
 Old Union Meetinghouse, in Farmington, Maine
 Old Webster Meeting House, in Webster, New Hampshire
 Old White Meeting House Ruins and Cemetery, in Summerville, South Carolina
 Porter Old Meetinghouse, in Porter, Maine
 Sandown Old Meetinghouse, in Sandown, New Hampshire